A meme hack is changing a meme to express a point of view not intended or inherent in the original image, or even opposite to the original. The meme can be thoughts, concepts, ideas, theories, opinions, beliefs, practices, habits, songs, or icons. Distortions of corporate logos are also referred to as subvertising. Another definition is: "Intentionally altering a concept or phrase, or using it in a different context, so as to subvert the meaning."

See also

Notes

Culture jamming techniques
Hack
Internet manipulation and propaganda